Mateo Lisica (born 9 July 2003) is a Croatian professional football player who plays for NK Istra 1961.

Club career 
Mateo Lisica made his professional debut for NK Istra 1961 on the 30 June 2020.

References

External links
 

2003 births
Living people
Sportspeople from Pula
Association football forwards
Croatian footballers
Croatia youth international footballers
NK Istra 1961 players
Croatian Football League players